ʿAlī ibn Abī al-ʿĀṣ or ʿAlī ibn Zaynab bint Muḥammad was a companion and a grandson of the Islamic prophet Muhammad through his eldest daughter. Ali was born to Abu al-As ibn al-Rabi' and Zaynab bint Muhammad, and his sister was Umamah bint Zaynab. Ali ibn Zaynab is reported to have died in infancy in 630 CE (9 AH).

Family tree

 * indicates that the marriage order is disputed
 Note that direct lineage is marked in bold.

External links 
 Holy prophet's life
 The Tribe of Quraish
 

Companions of the Prophet
630s deaths
Family of Muhammad
Year of birth unknown
Burials at Jannat al-Baqī